Yvette Reneé Wilson (March 6, 1964 – June 14, 2012) was an American comedian and actress. She was known for her role as Andell Wilkerson, the shopkeeper of the local hangout on the UPN sitcoms Moesha (1996–2001); and restaurant owner and Nikki's (played by Mo'Nique) best friend on its spinoff The Parkers (1999–2004). She had appeared in many comedy films such as House Party 3, Friday, and on Russell Simmons' Def Comedy Jam. She was also known for her role as Rita in the 1995 F. Gary Gray film Friday. Wilson died from cervical cancer at the age of 48.

Early life
Before she started her career in the entertainment business, Wilson attended San Jose State University and majored in communications.  In 1991 she was a contestant on the game show Supermarket Sweep.

Wilson first entered comedy when she lost a bet and had to perform as a stand-up comedian at a friend's club. She decided to make a living off comedy and never turned back.

Career
Her big break came with Thea, a short-lived sitcom from 1993 to 1994. Thea was cancelled after 19 episodes but the show helped her get a role in House Party 3. In addition, Wilson also had a minor role in the 1995 comedy movie Friday as Smokey's blind date and appeared in films such as Poetic Justice, starring Janet Jackson, and the film parody Don't Be a Menace to South Central While Drinking Your Juice in the Hood.

In 1995, she got the most important role of her career: Andell Wilkerson, a supporting character on the sitcom Moesha, which starred one of her castmates from Thea, R&B singer Brandy Norwood. Wilson's Andell character was the owner of The Den, a local teen hot spot on the show. In 2000, she left Moesha for its spin-off The Parkers, where she also played Andell Wilkerson,  who was the best friend of Mo'Nique's character Nikki Parker. After The Parkers ended, she went on to appear in shows like HBO's Def Comedy Jam and Fox Network shows. Wilson final acting role was in 2005's Ganked. She started her own company by the name Tigobitties Inc.

Personal life and death
Wilson was married to record producer Jerome Harry from 2001 until her death in 2012. Wilson suffered from kidney disease, having survived a kidney transplant and regular dialysis, but eventually lost a battle with cervical cancer, which metastasized throughout her entire body. A friend, Jeffrey Pittle, created a website for people to donate money to help with her medical bills and help with transportation costs.

Wilson died on June 14, 2012, aged 48.

Filmography

Film

Television

References

External links
 

1964 births
2012 deaths
20th-century American actresses
21st-century American actresses
Actresses from Los Angeles
African-American actresses
African-American female comedians
American film actresses
American television actresses
Deaths from cancer in California
Deaths from cervical cancer
San Jose State University alumni
American women comedians
Place of death missing
Comedians from California
20th-century American comedians
21st-century American comedians
20th-century African-American women
21st-century African-American women
21st-century African-American people